Aleksandra Wałaszek (born 1987) is a Polish female badminton player.

Achievements

BWF International Challenge/Series
Women's Singles

Women's Doubles

 BWF International Challenge tournament
 BWF International Series tournament

References

External links
 

1987 births
Living people
Polish female badminton players
Place of birth missing (living people)